Geophis latifrontalis, also known as the Potosí earth snake, is a snake of the colubrid family. It is found in Mexico.

References

Geophis
Snakes of North America
Reptiles of Mexico
Endemic fauna of Mexico
Taxa named by Samuel Garman
Reptiles described in 1883